The 2012–13 season of the Bayernliga, the second highest association football league in Bavaria after the creation of the new Regionalliga Bayern, was the fifth season of the league at tier five (V) of the German football league system and the 68th season overall since establishment of the league in 1945. The regular season started on 17 July 2012 and finished on 25 May 2013, followed by relegation play-off games. The league season was interrupted by a winter break, which lasted from 8 December 2012 to 22 February 2013. The league was split into a northern and a southern division, a system last in place in the 1962–63 season, expanding from 18 clubs to 37.

Standings

Bayernliga Nord 
The division featured fourteen new clubs with only TSV Großbardorf, FSV Erlangen-Bruck, Würzburger FV and FC Schweinfurt 05 having played in the Bayernliga in the previous season.

Bayernliga Süd 
The division featured fifteen new clubs with only SB/DJK Rosenheim, TSV Aindling, TSV Gersthofen and SpVgg Unterhaching II having played in the Bayernliga in the previous season.

Top goalscorers
The top goal scorers for the season:

Nord

Süd

Promotion play-offs

To the Regionalliga
The third placed teams of each Bayernliga division, TSV Großbardorf and BC Aichach, played the 16th and 17th placed Regionalliga Bayern teams, FC Augsburg II and SpVgg Bayern Hof for two spots in the 2013–14 Regionalliga. Both Augsburg and Hof retained their league place while Aichach and Großbardorf failed to gain promotion:
First leg

Second leg

To the Bayernliga
The second placed teams of each Landesliga division, together with the 15th placed team from the Bayernliga Nord and the 15th and 16th placed team Bayernliga Süd entered a play-off for two more places in the 2013–14 Bayernliga. All three Bayernliga clubs were relegated while the Landesliga teams of SV Raisting and VfR Garching were promoted:
First round – first leg

First round – second leg

Second round – first leg

Second round – second leg

References

External links 
 Official website  of the Bavarian Football Association 
 Bayernliga Nord 2012–13 on Fupa.net 
 Bayernliga Süd 2012–13 on Fupa.net 

2012-13
2012–13 Oberliga